Professor Thomas Stephen Potokar OBE (born January 1964) is chair of the Centre for Global Burn Injury Policy & Research at Swansea University. He is the founder and director of the charity Interburns. .

References

External links

Living people
1964 births
British plastic surgeons
Academics of Swansea University
Place of birth missing (living people)